The Ministry of Culture of Romania is one of the ministries of the Government of Romania. The current position holder is Lucian Romașcanu from the Social Democratic Party (PSD).

The Romanian National Institute of Historical Monuments, part of this ministry, maintains the list of historical monuments in Romania. The list, created in 2004–2005, contains historical monuments entered in the National Cultural Heritage of Romania.

List of Culture Ministers

See also 

 Culture of Romania
 List of historical monuments in Romania

References

External links
 MCC.ro
 
 GUV.ro
 Romanian National Institute of Historical Monuments
 List of Historical Monuments at Romanian Ministry of Culture and National Patrimony (in Romanian)
 List of Historical Monuments at Romanian National Institute of Historical Monuments (in Romanian)

Culture
Romania